The Lerici class is a class of minehunters constructed by Intermarine SpA and owned and operated by the Italian Navy. The class incorporates two subclasses: the first four ships are referred to specifically as the first series of the Lerici class, while eight more ships produced to a slightly modified design are known as "second series Lericis" or as the Gaeta class.

The class design has also been used as the basis for ships of the Royal Malaysian Navy (as the Mahamiru class), the Nigerian Navy, the United States Navy (as the ), the Royal Australian Navy (as the ), and the Royal Thai Navy (as the Lat Ya class). Three updated vessels were constructed for the Finnish Navy (the ). The Republic of Korea Navy operates an unlicensed derivative, known as the Ganggyeong class.

Design and service history
Twelve ships were constructed by Intermarine SpA between 1985 and 1996. The first four, referred to as the Lerici subclass) were ordered on 7 January 1978. Six more ships of an improved design (known as the Gaeta subclass) were ordered on 30 April 1988, with two more Gaetas ordered in 1991.

Lerici class
The four Lerici-class ships were launched from September 1982 through to April 1985, and were all commissioned into the Italian Navy during 1985.

Each ship has a standard complement of 47, made up of 4 officers, 7 clearance divers, and 36 ratings. They are equipped with one hyperbaric chamber, one mechanical minesweeper system Oropesa Mk4, two ROV Whitehead-Riva Calzoni MIN-77 (then replaced by one ROV Gaymarine Pluto GIGAS) and Gaymarine Pluto, remote-operated submersibles for mine investigation and clearance, and VDS FIAR SQQ-14 (IT) sonar. CMS (Combat Management System) is Datamat MM/SSN-714(V)3. 
Two navigation radars: one GEM Elettronica SPN-754 (I band) and one GEM Elettronica SPN-753(V)1 ARPA (I band), completed by integrated navigation system Motorola MRS III. 
The ships are armed with a single Oerlikon 20 mm cannon (then replaced by Browning M2 12.7 mm).

Gaeta class

Depending on the source, the Gaeta-class ships are considered to be either a Lerici subclass, or a separate class of ships.
The eight ships of the Second Series Lerici class, more commonly known as the Gaeta class, were all launched in the early 1990s, and were commissioned by May 1996. The Gaeta class is almost identical to the Lerici class: the main structural differences between the ships are that displacement of the latter is 77 tons greater, the hull is  longer, and the communications mast was moved from above the bridge to just forward of the exhaust funnel. The Gaetas also used an improved version of the VDS FIAR SQQ-14 (IT) sonar, which was fitted in 1991 to the four Lerici-class ships. ROV are Gaymarine Pluto and Gaymarine Pluto GIGAS.Navigation radar GEM Elettronica SPN-753 replaced with (V)9 ARPA version (I band).CMS was evolved version (Combat Management System) Datamat SSN-714(V)3UL. On board one larger hyperbaric chamber (8 seats).

Gaeta MLU
In 2010 Intermarine began MLU (mid-life update), expected to complete in 2018. New sonar is Thales 2093 Mk2, new CMS (Combat Management System) Selex ES SSN-714(V)4, new containerized and removable hyperbaric chamber and added new EMDV (Expendable Mine Disposal Vehicle) Gaymarine Plutino (MIKI, MIne KIller).

Derivatives
The Lerici class design has been successfully exported to Algeria, Australia, Finland, Malaysia, Nigeria, the United States, Thailand and Taiwan. However, an inflexible export policy and demands by Intermarine that all ships be built in Italy are believed to have prevented wider sales. These restrictions were lessened in the leadup to the deals with the United States and Australia.

Mahamiru class
The Royal Malaysian Navy operates four ships based on the Lerici class design: KDs Mahamiru (11), Jerai (12), Ledang (13), and Kinabalu (14). The four ships were ordered from Intermarine on 20 February 1981, commissioned into the Royal Malaysian Navy on 11 December 1985, and arrived in Malaysia on 26 March 1986. Referred to as "Malaysian Lericis" or as Mahamiru-class ships, two each are based in Lumut and Labuan.

Mahamiru-class ships vary in design from the Lerici class. The Malaysian ships are also equipped with Thomson Sintra TSM 2022 sonar, Thomson-CSF radar, and two PAP-104 remote-operated submersibles, and are  longer than the Italian vessels they were based on. Instead of the 20 mm Oerlikon, the ships are armed with a single Bofors 40 mm L/70 gun. The standard crew complement is 42, 5 of whom are officers.

In 2008, Mahamiru and Ledang were modernised by Thales as part of the Royal Malaysian Navy's Service Life Extension Program. The TSM 2022 sonars were upgraded to the Mark III version, and the ships were reconditioned to meet a minimum of ten more years active service.

Nigerian Lerici
In the late 1980s, the Nigerian Navy acquired two Lerici-class ships. Ohue (M 371) was ordered in April 1983, laid down on 23 July 1984, launched on 22 November 1985, and commissioned on 28 May 1987. Marabai (M 372) was laid down on 11 March 1985, launched on 6 June 1986, and commissioned on 25 February 1988.

The Nigerian ships are armed with two 30 mm cannons, and have a crew complement of 50, including 5 officers.

Because of a lack of funding and maintenance, Ohue and Marabai were among several ships of the Nigerian Navy that were non-operational by 1996. However, as at 2013, both of these vessels are currently undergoing refurbishment prior to rejoining the Nigerian Naval fleet.

Osprey class

In August 1986, following the cancellation of a 17-strong mine warfare ship class after the prototype failed shock testing, the United States Navy placed an order for a mine warfare ship based on the Lerici class. In order to keep construction of the twelve ships, referred to as the Osprey class, under the control of Intermarine, the company established Intermarine USA by acquiring the Sayler Marine Corporation. Initially, the twelve ships were to be built by Intermarine USA in Savannah, Georgia, but in October 1989, construction for four ships was contracted out to Avondale Industries. The ships were launched between March 1991 and June 1997, and were commissioned between November 1993 and December 1998.

The ships are fitted with two diesel motors driving two Voith Schneider Propellers; these cycloidal propellers eliminate the need for the aft two active rudders. The ships use a Raytheon/Thomson Sintra SQQ-32 VDS sonar for minehunting, and Alliant SLQ-48 remote vehicles for mine disposal. The ships normally carry a crew of 51, including four officers, and are armed with two  machine guns.

Upon entering service, the twelve ships were assigned to the United States Atlantic Fleet, with the intention that they remain in service for approximately twelve months before being transferred to the United States Navy Reserve. However, all of the ships remained in service until decommissioning in 2006 and 2007. The class was replaced in service by the s, and as of 2008, eight Ospreys had either been transferred to or marked for transfer to other navies: two each to the Hellenic Navy, Lithuanian Navy, Turkish Navy, and Republic of China (Taiwan) Navy.

Huon class

In 1991, a force structure review saw the need to replace the  inshore minehunters. The operating capabilities of the Bay class were found to be severely lacking, with four of the six ships cancelled before construction started. In 1994, a contract was awarded to Australian Defence Industries (ADI) to construct six minehunters based on the Gaeta subclass. The construction was to be a joint venture with Intermarine.

The hull of the first ship,  was constructed by the Intermarine shipyard in Sarzana, Italy, then was sent to Australia in 1995 for fitting out at ADI's shipyard in Newcastle, New South Wales. ADI constructed the other five ships in the class, which were all named after Australian rivers.

The ships use a GEC-Marconi Type 2093 sonar, two SUTEC Double Eagle remote mine disposal vehicles, and are armed with a 30 mm DC30B gun. The ships have a crew of 36 (including 6 officers), with further accommodation for 13 more, including 6 divers.

Lat Ya class
Eight minehunters based on the Gaeta class were ordered by the Royal Thai Navy on 19 September 1996, after Intermarine won the tendering process initiated in April that year. The other six ships were cancelled before they were laid down.

They use Atlas Elektronik radar and sonar, Pluto ROVs, and are fitted with a  MSI cannon. Each ship carries 8 officers, and 42 other crew.

Katanpää class

In 2004, the Finnish Navy began to look at replacements for the s, which had been in service since 1974. On 23 November 2006, a contract was signed with Intermarine to build three mine countermeasures vessels (initially referred to as the MCMV 2010 class, then as the MITO class).

The MITOs are based on the Huon class design, but with a redesigned superstructure.

Unlicensed designs

Ganggyeong class

The six Ganggyeong- (Swallow-) class ships of the Republic of Korea Navy are an unlicensed derivative of the Lerici class. Constructed by the Kangnam Shipbuilding Corporation, the class was commissioned into service between 1986 and 1994. The ships are smaller and less capable than the other Lerici designs.

List

Citations

References

External links

Mine warfare vessel classes
Minehunters of the Royal Australian Navy
Minehunters of the Italian Navy
Minehunters of the Royal Malaysian Navy
Minehunters of the Nigerian Navy
Minehunters of the Republic of Korea Navy
Minehunters of the United States Navy
Ships of the Royal Thai Navy